The Greens New South Wales' frontbench consists of all Greens members of the Parliament of New South Wales, Australia, serving as the party's spokespeople inside Parliament on various issues, each member being assigned shadow portfolios for their speaking duties. This allows the Greens to shadow government policies and actions from the party perspective. Unlike its federal counterpart and the major state parties, the Greens New South Wales do not elect a parliamentary leader. A spokesperson for Premier and Cabinet is appointed to speak on matters of leadership.

Arrangement (57th Parliament) 
The following arrangement was in place prior to the 2023 New South Wales state election.

Arrangement (56th Parliament) 
The following arrangement was in place prior to the 2019 New South Wales state election.

Arrangement (55th Parliament) 
As of 11 March 2015, the parliamentary portfolios of the Greens NSW were arranged as such:

Arrangement (54th Parliament) 
As of 17 March 2011, the parliamentary portfolios of the Greens NSW were arranged as such:

Arrangement (53rd Parliament) 
As of 1 December 2006, the parliamentary portfolios of the Greens NSW were arranged as such:

Timeline

References

External links
 Our State MPs - Greens NSW

New South Wales
1995 establishments in Australia